Verkhobuzh is a village in Zolochiv Raion, Lviv Oblast, western Ukraine.

The source of the Bug River is located in Verkhobuzh.

See also 
 List of villages in Lviv Oblast

References 

Villages in Zolochiv Raion, Lviv Oblast